Chhorn Sovannareach (Khmer: ឆន សុវណ្ណារាជ; Born 10 October 1985) is a Cambodia Singer/Celebrity, a songwriter, actor, and brand ambassador. Sovannareach began his career in early 2000s with 3 different productions. In 2007, he signed the contract with Rasmey Hang Meas and strengthen his reputation from then. Other than singing, Sovannareach also pursued his career in acting and got casting in different Khmer movies such as សិសិររដូវក្នុងបេះដូង. Sovannareach is a brand ambassador to different products. His latest contract is with Bosba Property.

Chhorns Sovannareach official Instagram account has over 595K followers.

Discography

Solo albums

Filmography

Television Series

TV Show

References

1. Mer Chanpolydet "Chhorn Sovannareach's style". The Phnom Penh Post. Retrieved January 13, 2013.

External links
 Chhorn Sovannareach on Facebook 
 Chhorn Sovannareach on Instagram

1985 births
21st-century Cambodian male singers
Living people